Peter Michael James (born 14 December 1935) was a rugby union player who represented Australia.

James, a centre, was born in Brisbane, Queensland and claimed a total of 2 international rugby caps for Australia.

References

Australian rugby union players
Australia international rugby union players
1935 births
Living people
Rugby union players from Brisbane
Rugby union centres